These genera belong to the subfamily Alleculinae, comb-clawed beetles.

Alleculinae genera

 Aeanes Champion, 1893  (the Neotropics)
 Alethia Champion, 1888  (North America and the Neotropics)
 Allecula Fabricius, 1801  (the Neotropics, the Palearctic, tropical Africa, and Indomalaya)
 Alogista Fåhraeus, 1870  (tropical Africa)
 Alogistopsis Borchmann, 1943  (tropical Africa)
 Amaropsis Champion, 1893  (the Neotropics)
 Amorphopoda Fåhraeus, 1870  (tropical Africa)
 Anamphidora Casey, 1924  (North America)
 Andrimus Casey, 1891  (North America)
 Androchirus Leconte, 1862  (North America)
 Anognathena Ando, 2017  (Indomalaya)
 Anthracula Fairmaire, 1897  (Indomalaya)
 Apalmia Fairmaire, 1896  (Indomalaya)
 Aptericula Borchmann, 1937  (tropical Africa)
 Asiomira Dubrovina, 1973  (the Palearctic)
 Asticostena Fairmaire, 1897  (Indomalaya)
 Atoichus Carter, 1915  (Australasia)
 Balassogloa Semenov, 1891  (the Palearctic)
 Bancocistela Pic, 1947  (tropical Africa)
 Barbora Novák, 2020  (Indomalaya)
 Barycistela Blackburn, 1891  (Australasia)
 Bearnicistela Pic, 1909  (Indomalaya)
 Blepusa Westwood, 1842  (the Neotropics)
 Bobina Novák, 2015  (the Palearctic and Indomalaya)
 Bobisthes Novák, 2019  (Indomalaya)
 Bolbostetha Fairmaire, 1896  (Indomalaya)
 Borbochara Novák, 2009  (Indomalaya)
 Borbonalia Novák, 2014  (the Palearctic and Indomalaya)
 Borborella Novák, 2020  (Indomalaya)
 Borboresthes Fairmaire, 1897  (the Palearctic and Indomalaya)
 Borchmannius Bousquet & Bouchard, 2015  (tropical Africa)
 Borneocistela Pic, 1922  (Indomalaya)
 Brachycula Fairmaire, 1906  (tropical Africa)
 Bratyna Westwood, 1875  (tropical Africa)
 Buxela Fairmaire, 1894  (Indomalaya)
 Capnochroa LeConte, 1862  (North America)
 Caulostena Fairmaire, 1896  (tropical Africa)
 Charisius Champion, 1888  (the Neotropics)
 Chitwania Novák, 2015  (Indomalaya)
 Chromatia LeConte, 1862  (North America)
 Cistelampra Fairmaire, 1897  (tropical Africa)
 Cistelina Seidlitz, 1896  (the Palearctic and Indomalaya)
 Cistelodema Borchmann, 1932  (Indomalaya)
 Cisteloida Fairmaire, 1882  (Indomalaya)
 Cistelomorpha Redtenbacher, 1868  (the Palearctic and Indomalaya)
 Cistelopsis Fairmaire, 1896  (the Palearctic and Indomalaya)
 Cnecosochara Reitter, 1913  (the Palearctic)
 Compsocula Fairmaire, 1898  (tropical Africa)
 Copistethus Seidlitz, 1890  (the Palearctic)
 Cornucistela Campbell, 1980  (the Palearctic)
 Costallecula Pic, 1954  (tropical Africa)
 Cryptomysia Pic, 1954  (tropical Africa)
 Cteisa Solier, 1835  (the Neotropics)
 Cteisodella Novák, 2020  (Indomalaya)
 Cteisodes Borchmann, 1932  (Indomalaya)
 Cteniopinus Seidlitz, 1896  (the Palearctic and Indomalaya)
 Cteniopus Solier, 1835  (the Palearctic)
 Cylindrothorus Solier, 1843  (tropical Africa)
 Dasytoxystropus Pic, 1921  (the Neotropics)
 Diastanus Fairmaire, 1902  (tropical Africa)
 Dimorphochilus Borchmann, 1908  (Australasia)
 Diopoenus Champion, 1888  (the Neotropics)
 Dioxycula Fairmaire, 1896  (Indomalaya)
 Doranalia Novák, 2020  (the Palearctic and Indomalaya)
 Dorota Novák, 2018  (Indomalaya)
 Ectatocera Fåhraeus, 1870  (tropical Africa)
 Ectenostoma Fåhraeus, 1870  (tropical Africa)
 Erxias Champion, 1888  (the Neotropics)
 Erzika Novák, 2020  (Indomalaya)
 Eubalia Laporte, 1840  (tropical Africa)
 Eucaliga Fairmaire & Germain, 1861  (the Neotropics)
 Euomma Boheman, 1858  (Australasia)
 Eutrapelodes Borchmann, 1929  (tropical Africa)
 Evaostetha Novák, 2008  (Indomalaya)
 Falsomophlus Pic, 1925  (Indomalaya)
 Falsopsilonycha Pic, 1930  (tropical Africa)
 Fifina Novák, 2018  (Indomalaya)
 Fifinoides Novák, 2020  (Indomalaya)
 Flabellalogista Pic, 1954  (tropical Africa)
 Gastrhaema Jacquelin du Val, 1863  (the Palearctic)
 Gerandryus Rottenberg, 1873  (the Palearctic)
 Gerdacula Novák, 2015  (Indomalaya)
 Gonodera Mulsant, 1856  (the Palearctic)
 Havanalia Novák, 2020  (the Palearctic)
 Heliomophlus Reitter, 1906  (the Palearctic)
 Heliostrhaema Reitter, 1890  (the Palearctic)
 Heliotaurus Mulsant, 1856  (the Palearctic and tropical Africa)
 Helopsallecula Pic, 1936  (tropical Africa)
 Helopsisomira Pic, 1952  (tropical Africa)
 Hemicistela Blackburn, 1891  (Australasia)
 Holdhausia Reitter, 1906  (the Palearctic)
 Homoropsis Fairmaire, 1886  (tropical Africa)
 Homotrysis Pascoe, 1866  (Australasia)
 Houaphanica Novák, 2020  (Indomalaya)
 Hovacula Fairmaire, 1898  (tropical Africa)
 Hymenalia Mulsant, 1856  (the Palearctic, tropical Africa, and Indomalaya)
 Hymenochara Campbell, 1978  (North America)
 Hymenorus Mulsant, 1852  (North America, the Neotropics, the Palearctic, and Indomalaya)
 Hypocistela Bates, 1879  (the Palearctic)
 Idatius Fairmaire, 1906  (tropical Africa)
 Impressallecula Pic, 1951  (tropical Africa)
 Indricula Novák, 2016  (Indomalaya)
 Isomira Mulsant, 1856  (North America, the Neotropics, the Palearctic, tropical Africa, and Indomalaya)
 Isomiropsis Borchmann, 1942  (tropical Africa)
 Jaklia Novák, 2010  (Indomalaya)
 Jophon Champion, 1895  (Australasia)
 Knausia Fall, 1931  (North America)
 Kombacula Novák, 2012  (Indomalaya)
 Kralia Novák, 2013  (the Palearctic)
 Ksukolcula Novák, 2017  (Indomalaya)
 Labetis C.O. Waterhouse, 1879  (Oceania)
 Lagriallecula Pic, 1920  (tropical Africa)
 Latacula Campbell, 1971  (the Neotropics)
 Lepturidea Fauvel, 1862  (Australasia)
 Liodocistela Pic, 1930  (Indomalaya)
 Litopous Matthews, 2012  (Australasia)
 Lobopoda Solier, 1835  (North America and the Neotropics)
 Loriculoides Novák, 2020  (Indomalaya)
 Lycula Campbell, 1976  (the Neotropics)
 Lystronychus Latreille, 1829  (North America and the Neotropics)
 Macrocistela Pic, 1941  (tropical Africa)
 Macrocistelopsis Pic, 1956  (Australasia)
 Madreallecula Kanda, 2013  (North America)
 Magdanalia Novák, 2020  (the Palearctic)
 Makicula Novák, 2012  (Indomalaya)
 Malaymira Novák, 2020  (Indomalaya)
 Matthewsotys Bouchard & Bousquet, 2021  (Australasia)
 Mayidicistela Pic, 1954  (tropical Africa)
 Megischia Solier, 1835  (the Palearctic)
 Megischina Reitter, 1906  (the Palearctic)
 Menes Champion, 1888  (the Neotropics)
 Menoeceus Champion, 1888  (North America and the Neotropics)
 Metistete Pascoe, 1866  (Australasia)
 Micrisomira Pic, 1930  (Indomalaya)
 Microamarygmus Pic, 1915  (Indomalaya)
 Microcistela Pic, 1904  (the Palearctic)
 Microcistelopsis Pic, 1922  (Australasia)
 Microprostenus Pic, 1921  (the Neotropics)
 Microstenogena Pic, 1924  (tropical Africa)
 Microsthes Novák, 2011  (Indomalaya)
 Mimocistela Borchmann, 1938  (tropical Africa)
 Mimopraogena Pic, 1952  (tropical Africa)
 Mycetochara Guérin-Méneville, 1827  (North America and the Palearctic)
 Mycetocharina Seidlitz, 1890  (the Palearctic)
 Mycetocula Novák, 2015  (Indomalaya)
 Narsodes Campbell, 1976  (the Neotropics)
 Neocistela Borchmann, 1909  (Australasia)
 Nesogenomorpha Pic, 1917  (tropical Africa)
 Nesotaurus Fairmaire, 1896  (tropical Africa)
 Netopha Fairmaire, 1893  (the Palearctic and Indomalaya)
 Nikomenalia Dubrovina, 1975  (the Palearctic and Indomalaya)
 Nocar Blackburn, 1891  (Australasia)
 Notacula Campbell, 1971  (the Neotropics)
 Notocistela Carter, 1915  (Australasia)
 Nypsius Champion, 1895  (Australasia)
 Obesacula Campbell, 1971  (the Neotropics)
 Omedes Broun, 1893  (Australasia)
 Ommatochara Borchmann, 1932  (Indomalaya)
 Ommatophorus W.J. MacLeay, 1872  (Australasia)
 Omocula Borchmann, 1937  (the Neotropics)
 Omolepta Fåhraeus, 1870  (tropical Africa)
 Omophlina Reitter, 1890  (the Palearctic)
 Omophlus Dejean, 1834  (the Palearctic)
 Onychomira Campbell, 1984  (North America)
 Oocistela Borchmann, 1908  (Australasia)
 Oracula Novák, 2019  (tropical Africa)
 Orchesiolobopoda Pic, 1919  (the Neotropics)
 Palpichara Borchmann, 1932  (Indomalaya)
 Palpicula Novák, 2018  (Indomalaya)
 Paracistela Borchmann, 1941  (the Palearctic and Indomalaya)
 Parahymenorus Campbell, 1971  (the Neotropics)
 Pemanoa Buck, 1955  (Australasia)
 Petria Semenov, 1894  (the Palearctic)
 Petrostetha Novák, 2008  (Indomalaya)
 Phediodes Campbell, 1976  (the Neotropics)
 Phedius Champion, 1888  (North America and the Neotropics)
 Piccula Bousquet & Bouchard, 2015  (tropical Africa)
 Pitholaus Champion, 1888  (the Neotropics)
 Pizura Novák, 2016  (Indomalaya)
 Platyallecula Blair, 1935  (tropical Africa)
 Podonta Solier, 1835  (the Palearctic)
 Podontinus Seidlitz, 1896  (the Palearctic)
 Polyidus Champion, 1888  (the Neotropics)
 Potocula Novák, 2012  (Indomalaya)
 Prionalia Novák, 2020  (the Palearctic)
 Prionychus Solier, 1835  (the Palearctic)
 Proctenius Reitter, 1890  (the Palearctic)
 Prostenus Klug, 1829  (the Neotropics)
 Pseudocistela Crotch, 1874  (worldwide)
 Pseudocistelopsis Novák, 2018  (Indomalaya)
 Pseudohymenalia Novák, 2008  (the Palearctic and Indomalaya)
 Pseudomorocaulus Pic, 1915  (tropical Africa)
 Psis Novák, 2019  (Indomalaya)
 Punctacula Campbell, 1971  (the Neotropics)
 Rhipidonyx Reitter, 1876  (Indomalaya)
 Scaletomerus Blackburn, 1891  (Australasia)
 Scaphinion Matthews, 2012  (Australasia)
 Scotobiopsis Brèthes, 1910  (the Neotropics)
 Seydelicistela Pic, 1954  (tropical Africa)
 Simarus Borchmann, 1909  (Australasia)
 Socotralia Novák, 2007  (tropical Africa)
 Spinecula Novák, 2019  (Indomalaya)
 Stenerophlina Reitter, 1906  (the Palearctic)
 Stenerula Fairmaire, 1875  (tropical Africa)
 Steneryx Reitter, 1890  (the Palearctic)
 Stenochidus Leconte, 1862  (North America)
 Stenogena Fairmaire, 1895  (tropical Africa)
 Stenogenomorpha Pic, 1919  (tropical Africa)
 Stilbocistela Borchmann, 1932  (Indomalaya)
 Strongyallecula Pic, 1955  (tropical Africa)
 Synallecula Kolbe, 1883  (tropical Africa)
 Tanychilus Newman, 1838  (Australasia)
 Taxes Champion, 1895  (Australasia)
 Telesicles Champion, 1888  (North America)
 Temnes Champion, 1888  (the Neotropics)
 Theatetes Champion, 1888  (the Neotropics)
 Tripolicryptus Strand, 1929  (the Palearctic)
 Tucumana Gebien, 1911  (the Neotropics)
 Upinella Mulsant, 1857  (the Palearctic and Indomalaya)
 Vietnalia Novák, 2021  (Indomalaya)
 Viriathus Fairmaire, 1902  (tropical Africa)
 Xylochus Broun, 1880  (Australasia)
 Xystropus Solier, 1835  (the Neotropics)
 Zizu Novák, 2019  (Indomalaya)
 Zomedes Watt, 1992  (Australasia)
 † Amberophlus Novák & Háva, 2019
 † Calcarocistela Nabozhenko, 2016
 † Jurallecula L.N. Medvedev, 1969
 † Mycetocharoides Schaufuss, 1889
 † Platycteniopus Chang, Nabozhenko, Pu, Xu, Jia, Li, 2016
 † Sinocistela Zhang, 1989

References